Reloaded is the second album by the grunge group Green Apple Quick Step, released in 1995 through Medicine Records. The album was produced by Nick DiDia and Pearl Jam guitarist Stone Gossard.

Critical reception
Trouser Press considered the album an improvement on the debut, writing that the band displays "real initiative" and that it spreads "its surprisingly useful stylistic wings." CMJ New Music Monthly wrote that the "alterna-rock promise of [the] debut in no way hints at the leaps and bounds by which the band seems to have grown, or the unexpected paths Reloaded follows."

Track listing
All songs by Green Apple Quick Step

Personnel

Green Apple Quick Step
Tyler Willman – vocals, acoustic guitar, organ
Steve Ross – guitar
Daniel Kempthorne – guitar
Mari Ann Braeden – bass, vocals
Bob Martin – drums

Additional personnel
Jerod Kaplan – additional percussion

Production personnel
Nick DiDia – production, engineering, mixing
Stone Gossard – production
Rick Senechal – engineering, mixing

References

1995 albums
Green Apple Quick Step albums